The Institute of Student Employers (ISE) is an independent, not-for-profit professional body that represents over 750 organisations which recruit and develop graduates in the United Kingdom.

The ISE was first established in October 1968, and is also one of the founding members of the International Network of Graduate Recruitment and Development Associations (INGRADA). Its offices are based in London.

Research

The ISE publishes a biannual Graduate Recruitment survey, which examines the current state of the graduate jobs market, based on responses from over 200 employers. 

Other significant areas of research include work-life balance, and the so-called ‘hidden talent pool’ of graduates not in work or training immediately after graduation. 

In June 2012, ISE was also awarded seed funding from the Department for Business, Innovation and Skills (BIS) to work in partnership with Association of Graduate Careers Advisory Services (AGCAS) in implementing recommendations suggested by the Wilson Review Of Business-University Collaboration.

Publications and Events

The ISE publishes all content online via its Knowledge Hub, having stopped printing the Student Employer magazine in journal format. The ISE continues to distribute a weekly email newsletter.

The ISE also hosts an annual three-day Conference for graduate recruitment professionals, where winners of the yearly ISE Awards are announced. Recent winners include Ernst & Young, Allen & Overy, and The University of Exeter.

References

External links
ISE official site
AAGE official site
NACE official site
CACEE official site
SAGRA official site
HKAGR official site

Graduate recruitment
Higher education organisations based in the United Kingdom